Fireteam 2200 is a 1991 video game published by SimSystems.

Gameplay
Fireteam 2200 is a game in which ground combat in the 23rd century can be played against the computer, or using a modem it can be played as a two-player game or head-to-head.

Reception
Jesse W. Cheng reviewed the game for Computer Gaming World, and stated that "FireTeam 2200 was able to combine wargaming "realism," role-playing, solid EGA graphics and excellent AdLib sounds into a nice package. Despite the game's weaknesses (no scenario builder, lack of mouse support and a bit of complexity), this game would be a worthy addition to any wargame grognard's collection."

Alan Bunker for Amiga Action rated the game 70% and described it as "a game that will probably occupy you for a couple of days or so but not much longer".

Reviews
Computer Gaming World - Nov, 1992
ASM (Aktueller Software Markt) - Aug, 1992

References

1991 video games
Amiga games
Computer wargames
DOS games
Turn-based strategy video games
Video games developed in the United States
Video games set in the 23rd century